This is a list of Canadian films which were released in 1972:

See also
 1972 in Canada
 1972 in Canadian television

References

1972
Canada
1972 in Canada